Lee Doran (born 23 December 1981) is a former Ireland international rugby league footballer who played in the 2000s and 2010s.

Background
Lee Doran was born in Wigan, Greater Manchester, England, he has Irish ancestors, and eligible to play for Ireland due to the grandparent rule.

Playing career
Lee Doran won the Rochdale Hornets’ 'Player of the Year' award in 2005, and was noted for his ability to break a tackle and his defence was also highly regarded, he scored two tries in 22 games for Widnes Vikings in 2007, he was named in the Ireland training squad for the 2008 Rugby League World Cup, and the Ireland squad for the 2008 Rugby League World Cup.

References

External links
(archived by web.archive.org) Profile at widnesvikings
(archived by web.archive.org) Profile leighrl.co.uk
Profile at rli.ie
Statistics at rugby.widnes.tv

1981 births
Living people
English people of Irish descent
English rugby league players
Ireland national rugby league team players
Leigh Leopards players
Oldham R.L.F.C. players
Rochdale Hornets players
Rugby league centres
Rugby league locks
Rugby league second-rows
Rugby league players from Wigan
Widnes Vikings players
Whitehaven R.L.F.C. players